Luocheng Mulao Autonomous County (zhuang: ,) is an ethnic Mulao county of northern Guangxi, China. It is under the administration of Hechi City. It is the only Mulao autonomous county in China.

Administrative divisions
There are 7 towns and 4 townships in the county:

 Towns:
Dongmen
Long'an
Huangjin
Xiaochang'an
Siba
Tianhe
Huaiqun
Townships:
Baotan Township
Qiaoshan Township
Naweng Township
Jian'ai Township

Languages
The Mulao language (or Mulam) is spoken by the Mulao people of Luocheng County.

At least seven varieties of Chinese are spoken in Luocheng County (Edmondson 1992:137).

Putonghua is the national language of China.
Gui-Liu Hua is a local Pinghua variety spoken in Guilin and Liuzhou. It was spoken by government officials formerly sent to administer the region, and also used to be spoken in the provincial court.
Tuguai Hua is the local Southwestern Mandarin vernacular spoken in Luocheng, Rongshui, and other nearby counties.
Magai is a Cantonese variety introduced by migrating merchants from Guangdong.
Ngai is a form of Southern Chinese with seven tones. It is spoken by 20,000 Han peasant agriculturalists.
Yangsan is an archaic form of Chinese now spoken by only 300 people. It retains voiced stops and ten tones.
Southern Min was introduced by recent migrants from Fujian.

Climate

References
Edmondson, Jerold A. 1992. "Fusion and diffusion in E, Guangxi Province, China". T. Dutton et al. (eds.) The language game: papers in memory of Donald C. Laycock (Pacific Linguistic Series, C-110). Department of Linguistics, Australian National University, Canberra, 135–144.

County-level divisions of Guangxi
Administrative divisions of Hechi
Autonomous counties of the People's Republic of China